A wythe is a continuous vertical section of masonry.

Wythe may also refer to:

 George Wythe, law professor and Declaration of Independence signer
 Wythe County, Virginia, a county named for him
 Wythe (Hampton, Virginia), a neighborhood